Hindeloopen is a railway station near Hindeloopen, Netherlands. The station opened on 28 November 1885 and is on the Leeuwarden–Stavoren railway between Sneek and Stavoren. The services are operated by Arriva.

Train services

Bus services

To get to Hindeloopen
It is a 10-minute walk - West

Gallery

External links
Arriva website 
Dutch Public Transport journey planner

See also
 List of railway stations in Friesland

Railway stations in Friesland
Railway stations opened in 1885